Arthur George Bottomley, Baron Bottomley, OBE, PC (7 February 1907 – 3 November 1995) was a British Labour politician, Member of Parliament and minister.

Early life
Before entering parliament he was a trade union organiser of the National Union of Public Employees (which later became part of UNISON). From 1929 to 1949 he was a councillor on Walthamstow Borough Council, and in 1945–1946 he was Mayor of Walthamstow. He was appointed an Officer of the Order of the British Empire (OBE) in the 1941 Birthday Honours.

Parliamentary career
He was first elected to parliament in the 1945 general election for the Chatham division of Rochester and he held the seat (later renamed Rochester and Chatham) until losing it in the 1959 general election to the Conservative Julian Critchley.  He returned to parliament by winning Middlesbrough East in a 1962 by-election and held the seat, and its successor Middlesbrough, until his retirement in 1983.

He was a junior minister in Clement Attlee's governments, being Parliamentary Under-Secretary of State for Dominion Affairs (1946–47), Parliamentary Under-Secretary of State for Commonwealth Relations (1947) and Secretary for Overseas Trade at the Board of Trade (1947–51).  In Harold Wilson's governments he was Secretary of State for Commonwealth Relations (1964–66) — during which time he sought to deal with the consequences of Rhodesia's Unilateral Declaration of Independence — and Minister of Overseas Development (1966–67).

Announced in the 1984 New Year Honours, he was created a life peer as Baron Bottomley of Middlesbrough in the County of Cleveland, on 31 January 1984.

Lord Bottomley died on 3 November 1995 aged 88.

Family
His wife, Bessie Ellen Bottomley (née Wiles), JP, whom he married in 1936, was named a Dame Commander of the Order of the British Empire in 1970 "[f]or public and social services."

Bessie Ellen Bottomley died in 1998 in Redbridge, Essex.

Publications
 The Use and Abuse of Trade Unions, London: Ampersand, 1963.
 With George Sinclair, Control of Commonwealth Immigration. An Analysis and Summary of the Evidence taken by the Select Committee on Race Relations and Immigration 1969–70. London: Runnymede Trust, 1970.
 Commonwealth, Comrades, and Friends, Somaiya Publications, 1986.

References

External links
 
 Catalogue of the Bottomley papers at the Archives Division of the London School of Economics.
 Parliamentary Archives, Papers of Arthur Bottomley

1907 births
1995 deaths
British Secretaries of State
Councillors in Greater London
Labour Party (UK) MPs for English constituencies
Labour Party (UK) life peers
Mayors of places in Greater London
Members of the Privy Council of the United Kingdom
Ministers in the Attlee governments, 1945–1951
Ministers in the Wilson governments, 1964–1970
Officers of the Order of the British Empire
UK MPs 1945–1950
UK MPs 1950–1951
UK MPs 1951–1955
UK MPs 1955–1959
UK MPs 1959–1964
UK MPs 1964–1966
UK MPs 1966–1970
UK MPs 1970–1974
UK MPs 1974
UK MPs 1974–1979
UK MPs 1979–1983
Life peers created by Elizabeth II